TL or Tl may refer to:

Arts and entertainment
 Teens' love, Japanese erotic fiction marketed towards women
 Télé Liban, a Lebanese television network
 Turn Left (newspaper),  Cornell University student publication

Language
 Tl (digraph), a digraph representing a voiceless alveolar lateral affricate in some languages
 Tagalog language (ISO 639 alpha-2 code: tl)

Organisations
 Airnorth (IATA airline code TL), an airline
 Public transport in the Lausanne Region, a transport company
 Teknisk Landsforbund, the Danish Union of Professional Technicians
 Team Liquid, a professional gaming and eSports team and community website

Science and technology
 Liquidus temperature, the maximum temperature at which crystals can co-exist with the melt
 Teralitre (Tl or TL), a metric unit of volume or capacity
 Thallium, symbol Tl, a chemical element
 Thermoluminescence dating, in geochronology
 Total length in fish measurement
 Transmission loss (TL), in acoustics, electronics, optics, and related fields

Computing
 .tl, East Timor's Internet country code top-level domain
 Transform, clipping, and lighting (T&L), in computer graphics

Vehicles
 Acura TL, a mid-size luxury car
 TL11, engine for Leyland Tiger
 Volkswagen TL, a compact car produced in the 1960s and 1970s

Other uses
 Nickname for Tenderloin, San Francisco
 East Timor (ISO 3166-1 alpha-2 country code)
 Turkish lira (TL), a currency
 Thameslink, a train operator in the UK